Todd Anthony Combs (born January 27, 1971) is a former hedge fund manager and current investment manager at Berkshire Hathaway, who has been the chief executive officer (CEO) of GEICO since January 2020. Alongside Ted Weschler, he is frequently cited as a potential successor of Warren Buffett as the chief investment officer of Berkshire. In 2016 he was appointed board member of JPMorgan Chase.

Early life and education 
Todd Anthony Combs was born and raised in Sarasota, Florida attending Riverview High School. He is a 1993 graduate of Florida State University, with degrees in finance and multinational business operations. Combs later attended Columbia Business School in New York City, graduating in 2002.

Career 
After graduating college, Combs became a financial analyst for the State of Florida Banking, Securities and Finance Division. From 1996 to 2000 he was a pricing analyst at Progressive Insurance and from 2000 to 2002 he was an insurance analyst at Keefe, Bruyette & Woods. From 2003 until 2005, Combs worked at Copper Arch Capital, a hedge fund run by Scott M. Sipprelle.

In 2005, with $35 million in seed money from Stone Point Capital, Combs formed Castle Point Capital. He served as Chief Executive Officer and Director of the Greenwich, Connecticut, based hedge fund until 2010, during which time the returns were a cumulative 34%, according to an investor. In October 2010, the Wall Street Journal reported that Buffett had tapped Combs to eventually replace him as the chief investment officer of Berkshire Hathaway.

In September 2016 Combs joined the board of U.S. bank JPMorgan Chase, an appointment that expanded Berkshire's ties in the financial services industry to the top three banks in America.

On December 23, 2019 Combs was announced as the new CEO of GEICO, a subsidiary of Berkshire. He will continue in his duties as a portfolio manager for Berkshire.

References

Further reading 
 McDaniel, Kip; Vasan, Paula. "Who Is This Man?", aiCIO, December 2010, pp. 32–35.

1971 births
American investors
American money managers
Columbia Business School alumni
People from Sarasota, Florida
Living people
Riverview High School (Sarasota, Florida) alumni
Florida State University alumni